Canada–Trinidad and Tobago relations refers to the bilateral relations between Canada and Trinidad and Tobago. Both Countries established full diplomatic relations in August 1962 after Trinidad's Independence. Since establishing relations, Trinidad and Tobago Defense Force have trained alongside Canadian Forces. As of 2011, there were an estimated 68,225 Trinidadian and Tobagonian Canadians and 3,000-5,000 Canadians living in Trinidad and Tobago, 92% of which hold dual citizenship.

Education
Students in Trinidad and Tobago Universities are eligible for scholarships to Canadian Universities. Several hundred student visas are approved each year by Canada's High Commission.

Trade
Bilateral trade totalled $481 million in 2017 between the two nations. Canada's exports to Trinidad and Tobago amounted to $305 million and included oil, mineral ores, machinery, and food products. Canada imported $176 million worth of goods from Trinidad and Tobago in 2017 which included organic chemicals and Food Products. Canadian investments in the country are concentrated in Trinidad's Petrochemical, Oil and Gas Industries.

Resident diplomatic missions
 Canada has a high commission in Port of Spain.
 Trinidad and Tobago has a high commission in Ottawa and a consulate-general in Toronto.

See also 
 Trinidadian and Tobagonian Canadians

References

 

 
Trinidad and Tobago
Bilateral relations of Trinidad and Tobago
Trinidad and Tobago and the Commonwealth of Nations
Canada and the Commonwealth of Nations